John or Jonathan Wade may refer to:

John Wade (14th century), UK member of parliament for Lyme Regis in 1395
John Wade (born 1893), American architect, designed the Buffalo City Hall
John Wade (20th century), former Tennessee Commissioner of Tourist Development
John Wade (American football) (born 1975), American football center
John Wade (author) (1788–1875), British writer
John Wade (miller) (1842 England–1931), Australian cornflour manufacturer
John Wade (rower) (born 1928), American Olympic rower
John Chipman Wade (1817–1892), Canadian lawyer, politician
John Donald Wade (1892–1963), American academic
John Francis Wade (1711–1786), English hymnist
John Wade (footballer) (1871–1937), professional English footballer
Jonathan Wade (born 1984), professional American football cornerback
Jonathan Wade (curler) (20th century), Australian curler

See also
Jack Wade (disambiguation)
John Wade House, Massachusetts